The  is a Japanese international school in Acton, London Borough of Ealing. The , a Japanese supplementary school, is a part of the institution.

Junko Sakai (酒井 順子 Sakai Junko), author of Japanese Bankers in the City of London: Language, Culture and Identity in the Japanese Diaspora, described the school as one of the "geographical centres" of London's Japanese community.

In 1999 the Saturday school programme had three divisions: elementary school for ages 6–12, junior high school for ages 13–15, and senior high school, equivalent to the English sixth-form. The Saturday school uses three campuses: the Acton Campus (アクトン校舎 Akuton Kōsha), which uses the Japanese School in London building; the Brent Campus (ブレント校舎 Burento Kōsha), which uses the Whitefield School; and the Croydon Campus (クロイドン校舎 Kuroidon Kōsha), which uses the Croydon School for Girls.

History

The school, operated by the Japanese Ministry of Education, was established with the financial involvement of Japanese companies. It first opened as a supplementary school, with four teachers and 20 students, in the Convent of Our Lady Sion in September 1965. It was upgraded to an official supplementary school in 1974 when the Japanese Ministry of Education sent its first teacher; it had done so due to an increase in the student body. The day school was established on 18 June 1976. The Japanese Ministry of Education had sent Katsuya Tanaka, the first headmaster, to London the previous April.

In October 1976 the school had 79 students, with 54 in primary school and 25 in junior high school. That month it moved to several buildings on the property of the Japan Club and the Japan Embassy Information Service Centre. In April 1977 the school moved to a new location, the current North Bridge House School in Camden, In April 1987, it moved to West Acton, in a site formerly held by a British educational system school, the Haberdashers' Aske's School for Girls. At the time of the move, the Japanese community had a position of relative expansion.

In 1987 the day school had 657 students. In 1991 the school had 980 students.

In 1999 the Saturday school had 1,602 students and 82 teachers at three sites, making made it the largest of the eight Japanese Saturday schools in the United Kingdom. At the time the Saturday school had three sites: Acton, Camden, and Croydon.

It was a site of filming for the 2009 film An Education.

Academic standards
The 2014 Ofsted report graded the day school as 'a school that requires improvement', down from "good" in 2011. While the behaviour and safety of pupils was rated as 'good', leadership and management, quality of teaching and achievement of pupils were all cited as requiring improvement. A standard inspection in 2017 also found that the school required improvement, and in 2018 it was found inadequate. There were additional inspections—with no reported grade—in 2018 and 2019.  the last inspection was an additional one on 4 June 2019.

Student demographics
In 2001 the day school had 583 students. In 2012 most Japanese living in London sent their children to either the Japanese school or to local schools. In 2003 Paul White, author of "The Japanese in London: From transience to settlement?", wrote that "even company movers do not necessarily put their children through the Japanese schooling system in London" and several British and international schools in London cater to Japanese students.

Saturday school demographics
In 1999 the Saturday school had 1,602 students, including 1,152 students in 48 elementary school classes, 258 students in 12 junior high school classes, and 93 senior high school students in four classes. That year, the average Saturday school class sizes were 24 pupils per class in elementary school, 21.5 pupils per class in junior high school, and 23.25 pupils per class in the senior high school. In 1999 within the Saturday school there were 98 children of mixed British and Japanese heritage who came from mostly Anglophone homes. The Saturday school provided "basic" classes for these pupils, with those students divided into five classes.

Teachers
In 1991 teachers of the day school were sent by the Ministry of Education of Japan for secondments (terms of temporary transfer) of three years.

In 1999 the Saturday school had 82 teachers, the majority of whom were women. In regards to the Saturday school the head teacher and senior teachers originate from Japan while the school recruited other teachers locally, including postgraduate students studying in the United Kingdom and housewives.

Curriculum
The Saturday school uses approved textbooks from the Japanese Ministry of Education.

Transport
The school has a system of buses that picks up and drops off Japanese students living in various areas in London.

Funding
The school is primarily funded by tuition fees, though it also receives a subsidy from the Japanese Ministry of Education and donations from Japanese companies. The school, like other British independent schools, has a charitable status.

See also

 Japanese community of London
 Embassy of Japan, London
 Japan–United Kingdom relations

British international schools in Japan:
 The British School in Tokyo

Japanese senior high school programs in England:
 Rikkyo School in England
 Teikyo School United Kingdom

References
 Aizawa, Kazue. "The Japanese Saturday School." In: Yamada-Yamamoto, Asako and Brian J. Richards. Japanese Children Abroad: Cultural, Educational, and Language Issues (Issue 15 of Bilingual education and bilingualism). Multilingual Matters, 1999. , 9781853594250.
 Sakai, Junko. Japanese Bankers in the City of London: Language, Culture and Identity in the Japanese Diaspora (Routledge Studies in Memory and Narrative). Routledge, October 12, 2012. , 9781134645084.
 White, Paul. "The Japanese in London: From transience to settlement?" In: Goodman, Roger, Ceri Peach, Ayumi Takenaka, and Paul White (editors). Global Japan: The Experience of Japan's New Immigrant and Overseas Communities. Routledge, 2003. , 9780203986783.

Notes

Further reading
  Ikezaki, Kimie (池崎 喜美惠 Ikezaki Kimie; Tokyo Gakugei University). "The view of home life and home economics of the students in the Japanese School : The case of the Japanese School in London and the Institut Cultural Franco-Japonais" (Archive: 日本人学校の児童・生徒の家庭生活観と家庭科観 : ロンドンおよびパリ日本人学校の事例をもとに). Bulletin of Tokyo Gakugei University, Educational sciences (東京学芸大学紀要. 総合教育科学系), Tokyo Gakugei University. 58, 361-369, 2007-02. English abstract (Archive). See profile at CiNii, See profile at Tokyo Gakugei University.
 Makita, Takashi (蒔田 孝 Makita Takashi). "在外教育施設における障害児教育 : ロンドン日本人学校のテムズ学級." 在外教育施設における指導実践記録 24, 181-185, 2001. Tokyo Gakugei University. See profile at CiNii.
 大渕 栄一 (前ロンドン日本学校:佐賀大学文化教育学部附属特別支援学校). "ロンドン日本人学校における特別支援教育の取組 (第1章 共同研究員報告)" 在外教育施設における指導実践記録 32, 7-10, 2009-10-12. Tokyo Gakugei University. See profile at CiNii.
 稲邊 宣彦 (前ロンドン日本人学校教諭・岩手大学教育学部附属養護学校教諭). "在外教育施設における特別支援教育 : ロンドン日本人学校における校内体制について." 在外教育施設における指導実践記録 25, 120-123, 2002. Tokyo Gakugei University. See profile at CiNii.
 山田 耕司. "在外教育施設の特色を生かした総合的な学習--ロンドン日本人学校中学部を事例として." 九州教育学会研究紀要 34, 91-98, 2006. 九州教育学会. See profile at CiNii.

External links

 Japanese School in London  
 The Japanese School London (Archive) 
 "Japanese School in London." The Weekender. BBC Learning English. February 2006. - Interview of Mrs. Kiyoe Tsuruoka, head teacher at the school
 London Nihonjin Gakko English Department

Acton, London
Educational institutions established in 1965
Private co-educational schools in London
Private schools in the London Borough of Ealing
International schools in London
London
London
London
1965 establishments in England